Syedpur Pilot High School is a secondary school for boys and girls, located at Syedpur in Jagannathpur Upazila, Sunamganj District, Bangladesh. It serves students from class 6 to class 10.

Academics
The school has three departments, Science, Commerce and Arts

It also has BNCC and Scout.

References

External links
 

Educational institutions established in 1963
High schools in Bangladesh
1963 establishments in East Pakistan